Quién Sabe Creek is a tributary stream of Los Muertos Creek, in San Benito County, California. Los Muertos Creek is in turn tributary to Tres Pinos Creek and Tres Pinos to the San Benito River, itself tributary to the Pajaro River.

References 

Rivers of San Benito County, California
Diablo Range